Plebejidea is a Palearctic genus of butterflies in the family Lycaenidae.

Species
Listed alphabetically: 

 Plebejidea chamanica (Moore, 1884) Levant (deserts)
 Plebejidea loewii (Zeller, 1847)
 Plebejidea sanoga (Evans, 1925) West Himalaya
 Plebejidea afshar (Eckweiler, 1998) Iran

References

External links

Polyommatini
Lycaenidae genera